"i Got a Girl" is a song by alternative rock group Tripping Daisy. Island Records released the song as the lead single from the band's second studio album, i am an ELASTIC FIRECRACKER (1995) in June 1995, against the wishes of the band. The song is an ode to Tim DeLaughter's partner, Julie Doyle, and lists off her characteristics. 

The song was a commercial success and reached number six on the Billboard Modern Rock Tracks chart, and was the biggest hit of the band's career.

Track listing
 i Got a Girl – 4:06
 Noose – 4:50
 Cause Tomb Shop – 2:37
 Margarita Tropendzando – 3:53

Charts

References

External links

1995 singles
Island Records singles
1995 songs
Tripping Daisy songs